Christian Bryant (born March 21, 1992) is a former American football safety. He was drafted by the St. Louis Rams in the seventh round of the 2014 NFL Draft. He played college football at Ohio State.

Early years
Bryant attended Glenville High School in Cleveland, Ohio.

College career
Bryant was pressed into safety duty as a true freshman in 2010 because of an injury to Tyler Moeller, but a foot issue kept him out of five games later in the season. He played in all 12 games in 2011, started nine times while battling through a shoulder issue that finally caused him to miss the regular season finale at Michigan. Ranked in a tie for third in the Big Ten with eight pass break-ups, and his eight total passes defended (PBUs and INTs) ranked 13th in the league. Was tied for second among Buckeyes in passes defended and was also third on the team with 68 tackles. Bryant had a fine junior campaign in 2012 that saw him earn second-team all-Big Ten Conference honors. His 70 tackles trailed only teammate Ryan Shazier's 115, and his 13 passes defended (12 PBUs and one interception) ranked sixth in the Big Ten.

Professional career

St. Louis / Los Angeles Rams
Bryant was drafted by the Rams in the seventh round 241st overall in the 2014 NFL Draft. He was waived during final cuts on August 30, 2014. He was signed to the Rams practice squad a few days later.

Bryant was waived for final roster cuts before the start of the 2015 season, but was signed to the practice squad on September 6, 2015. On October 2, he was promoted to the active roster. He was waived on October 23, 2015. He re-signed with the Rams four days later.

On September 3, 2016, Bryant was waived by the Rams as part of final roster cuts.

Arizona Cardinals
On October 4, 2016, Bryant was signed to the Arizona Cardinals' practice squad. He was promoted to the active roster on November 1, 2016. He was released by the Cardinals on November 28, 2016.

New York Giants
On November 30, 2016, Bryant was signed to the Giants' practice squad.

Arizona Cardinals (second stint)
On December 28, 2016, Bryant was signed by the Cardinals off the Giants' practice squad. He was waived by the Cardinals on May 11, 2017.

Cleveland Browns
On August 23, 2017, Bryant signed with the Cleveland Browns. He was waived on September 1, 2017 during roster cutdowns.

Birmingham Iron
In 2018, Bryant signed with the Birmingham Iron of the Alliance of American Football for the 2019 season. He was waived before the start of the regular season, but was re-signed on February 19, 2019. He was waived again on March 4, 2019. He was added to the team's rights list and re-signed to a contract on April 1, 2019. The league ceased operations in April 2019.

References

External links
Los Angeles Rams bio
Ohio State Buckeyes bio

1992 births
Living people
Players of American football from Cleveland
American football safeties
Ohio State Buckeyes football players
St. Louis Rams players
Los Angeles Rams players
Arizona Cardinals players
New York Giants players
Cleveland Browns players
Birmingham Iron players